Pseudocollix hyperythra is a moth in the family Geometridae. It is found from Sri Lanka and India to Taiwan and Japan, Burma, Borneo, Java, Luzon and Sulawesi.

Adults are pale brown.

Subspecies
Pseudocollix hyperythra hyperythra
Pseudocollix hyperythra catalalia (Prout 1941) (Taiwan)

References

Moths described in 1895
Melanthiini